Garcinia spicata is a species of medium tree with 30 ft in the family Clusiaceae. It is native to India and Sri Lanka. The tree produces a fruit which is edible and has been described as being similar to durian in flavor. It is sometimes called garlic fruit or bitter garcinia. It is planted as an ornamental in sea spray areas.

References

Garcinia spicata
India Biodiversity

spicata
Taxa named by Joseph Dalton Hooker